is a Japanese romance drama adult visual novel developed by CUFFS ("Sphere"). The game was originally released for Windows on December 5, 2008. It was adapted into a serialized manga and an anime television series. A sequel/fan disk titled Haruka na Sora was released later on October 24, 2009, which contains new and expanded scenarios for several characters from the original game.

Plot
Tragically orphaned by a car accident, the Kasugano twins travel to their grandparents' countryside residence in Okukozome via railcar, hoping to reconstruct the shards of a shattered life. Two lonely souls so physically alike, yet spiritually divergent, they are unaware of the challenges these conflicting expectations will unveil in the days to come. Uncertain of the future, Haruka Kasugano clings to memories of the past, hoping to find the strength he needs to protect his ailing sister. As the story develops, it tells four stories, each with one girl; Kazuha Migiwa: rich but kind, Akira Amatsume: polite but sad, Nao Yorihime: depressed but hopeful, Sora Kasugano: petite but fierce.

Characters

Main

Voiced by: Hiro Shimono (anime, teenager), Megumi Matsumoto (anime, child) 
The protagonist of the series, with a gentle appearance and slim profile, Haruka in many ways is the spitting image of his twin sister, Sora. Personable and honest, he forges lasting friendships with remarkable ease. Haruka copes with the loss of his parents with a stout heart, burdened with the knowledge that the future of his delicate sister depends on him. He cannot swim. Haruka is well regarded around the village, as their grandmother was once a doctor there. The game depicts routes in which Haruka engages in romantic and sexual relationships with the heroines of the story. If Sora's route is chosen, he realizes that he is in love with Sora and they enter into a lovers' relationship. However, after being caught by Nao and Kozue, he tries to end it, but decides that being together with Sora is the most important to him and they run away together.

Voiced by: Hiroko Taguchi (game (credited as "Shiranami"), anime) 
She is a quiet, fragile and reclusive girl, fraternal twin sister to the protagonist. Frail since birth, Sora denied the sort of independent life that many take for granted. Yet beneath Sora's angelic doll-like appearance lies a troublesome personality prone to emotional withdrawal, intellectual and physical laziness and a severe lack of social graces. She spends most of her time surfing the Internet and eating crisps and instant food, so long as Haruka is by her side. Her strong bond with her brother, strengthened as a result of the tragic loss of their parents, leads her to fantasizing about incest and she goes to great lengths to seduce him or at least to get him to spend more time with her. She hates Nao, although it is implied that they were once good friends. She is often seen clinging to a stuffed rabbit toy, which she received as a present from her mother before she died, which lends her a deceptively childlike character.

Voiced by: Yuka Inokuchi (game (credited as "Ayaka Kimura"), anime) 
Beautiful, intelligent and an excellent swimmer, Nao is Haruka's next-door neighbor and childhood friend. When the Kasugano twins last visited the area, their departure was particularly painful for Nao, who, for some reason, had grown quite close to Haruka, after having raped him on one occasion, about which she expresses guilt. Upon their return, she rekindles their former close relationship. Nao's compassion and maturity projects a sense of sisterly love towards others, though for Haruka there is a deeper and more intimately feeling. She ends her relationship with Haruka after catching the twins making love. She grew apathetic and sad after the twins left the village.

Voiced by: Mana Tsukishiro (game), Kayo Sakata (anime) 
Akira is Haruka's energetic classmate with an innocent personality that makes befriending the girl's second nature. Her enthusiasm is contagious to those around her. She was orphaned as a baby and taken in by the keeper of the local shinto shrine and raised as his granddaughter when none of her more distant relatives were willing to take her. Although still only a teenager, Akira has been the only miko and shrine keeper since her foster grandfather died. She spends much of her time practicing the habits and traditions, including performance of requisite ceremonies and holiday festivals. She also devotes a lot of her time to helping the elderly in the village, making her beloved by all. It is strongly implied that she is the illegitimate daughter of Kazuha's father.

Voiced by: Ryōko Ono (game (credited as "Nazuna Gogyo"), anime) 
Haruka's classmate, the beautiful daughter of an influential magnate, Kazuha lives a cultured life that could be compared to that of a modern princess. Sharp-minded and attentive to detail as a result of her parents' constant travels and long-distance liaisons, she learned from a young age to behave responsibly, as befitting her social standing. Nevertheless, Kazuha does not consider herself superior to others, and doesn't hesitate to lend a helping hand whenever asked. Kazuha is an experienced viola player, yet she shies away from playing in competitions, preferring to play only for those she cares for. She dotes on Akira constantly and worries excessively for her well-being, and this leads some to speculation that they may be romantically involved. It is revealed (implied) that they are half-sisters with Kazuha referring to Akira as sister. Kazuha's excessive concern for Akira stems from her desire to make up for her mother's refusal to acknowledge Akira's existence and her father's apparent neglect of her.

Supporting

Voiced by: Yukari Minegishi (game (credited as "Airi Himekawa"), anime)
Representant of Haruka, Ryouhei, Kazuha and Akira's class, often nicknamed by "class rep". She fell in love at first sight when she saw Haruka due to his gentle profile and appearance, Kozue is seen by the others as a shy however serious person, she is also very polite and through her shy and responsible appearance she has a "delusion" mode where she imagine being in a romantic relationship with Haruka due to her crush towards him. In Sora's storyline, she is the one who later catches the twins having sex and the one who can't accept their relationship the most due to her feelings toward Haruka, in the end of the final episode she questions Nao if in love all that matters is the feelings. In Haruka na Sora she is the protagonist of her own route.

Voiced by: Ryōko Tanaka (game (credited as "Hikaru Isshiki"), anime)
Best friend to Motoka Nogisaka and proprietor of a family-owned candy store, the rough looking Yahiro would prefer spending her time sleeping and drinking. In truth, her ill-tempered and sardonic mannerisms hide Yahiro's true personality: a woman whose past is littered with lost dreams, forgotten promises, and broken romances. She has been Akira's unofficial guardian since her foster grandfather died and none of his relatives was willing to look after her. In an attempt to understand the undercurrents that he perceives surrounding Akira and Kazuha, Haruka persuades Yahiro to explain that, unbeknownst to the other characters, Akira's father has been aiding her financially since she has spent her savings from when she worked in the city as well as the scant earnings from the candy store to pay for Akira's education and other needs. In Haruka na Sora she shows a more cute side of her as a "tsundere" in her route.

Voiced by: Tae Okajima (game (credited as "Soyogi Tono"), anime)
Motoka is a college student struggling to make ends meet, working as a maid in the Migiwa Household to pay for her tuition expenses. While not ideally suited for household chores, her warm compassion and captivating personality offset these deficiencies. She is best friends with Ifukube Yahiro, a notoriously heavy drinker, which makes Motoka's low tolerance to alcohol a particularly hazardous social issue, especially since she has a particular fondness for the taste of sake. She is the star of the anime's omake bonus feature, in which she entertains people with her skilled impressions of other characters, and eventually falls in love with Haruka, despite him being significantly younger than her.

Voiced by: Sai Ushirono (game), Takurou Nakakuni (anime)
Haruka's classmate. For all his faults and freakish behavior, Ryouhei is the kind of person you can always count on, in spite of being a self-confessed idiot. Carefree and spontaneous, he brands himself as the ultimate ladies man, applying cheesy pickup lines whenever a pretty face draws near. Yet when the situation calls for it, Ryouhei can offer profoundly sound advice, with an eye that quickly identifies the root of a problem.

Development

Staff
Illustrations by: Takashi Hashimoto, Hiro Suzuhira
Script by: Yukiji Tachikaze, Seiri Asakura
Music by: Manack

Release history
The game was originally released for Windows PC on December 5, 2008. A sequel/fan disk titled Haruka na Sora was released later on October 24, 2009, which contains full scenarios for Kozue and Yahiro, an expansion to Sora's story from the original game, and additional bonus material.

Adaptations

Anime
Yosuga no Sora was adapted into a 12-episode anime series that started airing on October 4, 2010. Each episode consists of a 22-minute feature segment and a 3-minute omake segment. The main plot of the anime is presented in a multi-arc branching format that independently tells the stories of Kazuha, Akira, Nao, and Sora while sharing certain common episodes. The title of each episode incorporates the names of the characters it concerns. The bonus segment focuses on Motoka's story, relying more extensively on humor and super deformed character designs. Each segment has its own ending credit sequence in each episode. The anime's opening theme is "Hiyoku no Hane"-(比翼の羽根) by eufonius, and the ending themes are "Tsunagukizuna"-(ツナグキズナ) by Nekocan feat. Junca Amaoto, and "Pinky Jones"-(ピンキー・ジョーンズ) by Momoiro Clover.

The first volume of the series was released by King Records for DVD and Blu-ray Disc formats on December 22, 2010, and the final fourth volume was released on March 26, 2011, with a limited edition Blu-ray Disc, including the stuffed toy strap of Sora Kasugano.

The series premiered on Toku in the United States on December 31, 2015.

Episode list

(In brackets are the episode numbers for each arc, e.g. (A3) is the third episode in Akira's arc. Legend: A-Akira, K-Kazuha, N-Nao, S-Sora.)
The arcs' episodes presented in order are: K:1-4; A:1-2,5-6; N:1,7-9; S:1,7,10-12. Episodes of an extra arc, that of Motoka, happen at the end of each episode.
{|class="wikitable" width="98%"
|-
! # !! Title !! Original air date
|-
| colspan="150" bgcolor="#DCBCFF"|
|-

|}

Drama CD
There are 5 Drama CDs: 2 released with the purchase of the original visual novel "Yosuga no Sora" from stores Sofmap and Messe Sanoh, 1 released with the pre-ordering of its Fan Disc "Haruka na Sora", and 2 released with the purchase of the Blu-ray volumes 2 and 4 of its anime adaptation.

Manga
Yosuga no Sora was adapted into a manga of the same title, illustrated by Takashi Mikaze, and serialized from October 2009 to January 2011 issues of Kadokawa Shoten's Comp Ace magazine. It was compiled into two volumes.

Music
The OST for the original game, with music composed by Manack, was released by Sphere on February 27, 2009.

The OST for the anime adaptation, with music composed by Manabu Miwa (Manack) and Bruno Wen-li, consists of both new compositions and newly arranged versions of tracks from the original game. It was released on two CDs, subtitled "Arrange" and "New", accompanying the Japanese Blu-ray Disc release of the anime with volumes 1 and 3 respectively.

There are 9 music releases: 3 affiliated to the original visual novel "Yosuga no Sora", 1 affiliated to its fan disc "Haruka na Sora", and 5 affiliated to its anime adaptation. Some titles are not consistent among official, retailers, and databases, thus their normalized titles are given following style guidelines from MusicBrainz.

Notes

References

External links
Sphere's official Yosuga no Sora website 
Sphere's official Haruka na Sora website 
Official Yosuga no Sora anime website 
Kodokawa Shoten Yosuga no Sora manga volume 1 
Kodokawa Shoten Yosuga no Sora manga volume 2 (end) 

2008 video games
2010 Japanese television series endings
Anime television series based on video games
AT-X (TV network) original programming
Bishōjo games
Eroge
Feel (animation studio)
Harem anime and manga
Harem video games
Incest in anime and manga
Incest in television
Japan-exclusive video games
Manga based on video games
Romance video games
Romance anime and manga
Seinen manga
Video games developed in Japan
Visual novels
Windows games
Windows-only games